The Townhouse Gallery was established in 1998 as an independent, non-profit art space in Cairo, Egypt, with a goal of making contemporary arts accessible to all without compromising creative practice. The Townhouse supports artistic work in a wide range of media through exhibitions, residencies for artists and curators, educational initiatives and outreach programs. By establishing local and international relationships, as well as diversifying both the practitioners and audiences of contemporary art, the Townhouse aims to support and expand the knowledge, appreciation and practice of contemporary arts in Egypt and the region.

Exhibits and programs 
The gallery is located in downtown Cairo's bustling car mechanics district.  It curates over twelve annual exhibitions in the 650-square-meter Factory and the First Floor gallery of its main building. The exhibitions feature the work of young emerging artists alongside those who are internationally recognized. Many local artists with early shows at the Townhouse have gone on to exhibit worldwide.

The Townhouse has initiated numerous large-scale events, beginning with the citywide Nitaq Festival in 1999. PhotoCairo, the first festival in Egypt exclusively dedicated to photography and video art, was launched in 2002.

Since its inception, the Townhouse has strived to make the arts accessible to different groups of society, whilst using them as a powerful medium for integration and understanding. The gallery's Outreach Program offers a number of arts workshops for adults and children, with participants coming from all over Cairo, including those with special needs and from marginalized communities.

The gallery collaborates with institutions and arts professionals both regionally and internationally to create exhibitions, share resources, and facilitate artist exchanges.

Each year, several international artists hold residencies at the Townhouse, working in studios on the gallery premises and pursuing independent projects in the city. Visiting artists often lead workshops during their stay. In 2009, the Townhouse launched the Rooftop Studio Project, a local residency program for Egyptian artists in need of affordable workspaces. The gallery is currently expanding its residency opportunities to curators and writers with the aim of providing opportunities for interdisciplinary practices to emerge and be independently sustained.

Located on the second floor of Townhouse's main building, the library holds books, journals, and other publications related to the arts. Sections are dedicated to Egyptian art history, monographs on Egyptian artists, and catalogues of exhibitions featuring the work of artists from the Middle East. The library is also a resource for artists researching grants and scholarships as well as educators who want to learn more about child development, refugee issues, and other topics.

List of artists 

Ahmed Askalany, Amal Kenawy, Amina Mansour, Amre Heiba, Basim Magdy, Barry Iverson, Ayman Ramdan, Doa Aly, Hala Alkoussy, Huda Lutfi, Jihan Ammar, Lara Baladi, Maha Maamoun, Martin Mcinally, Mohamed Skarkawy, Nader Sadek, Nermine Hammam, Omar Ghayyatt, Osama Dawod, Rana El Nemer, Rehab El Sadek, Sabah Naim, Scott Baily, Shady El Noshokaty, Susan Hefuna, Tarek Zaki, Wael Shawky, Warren Neidich, Yasser Gerab, Youssef Nabil, Sameh Al Tawil, Mohamed Shoukry

Exhibits and events 

In 2000 and 2001, the Townhouse Gallery contributed to the establishment of the Nitaq Festival in Cairo, which was an art festival situated in downtown that aimed to expose the contemporary art scene to the public. The festival included multimedia video installations which were created by various artists including Lara Baladi, Amina Mansour, Hassan Khan, Wael Shawky and Mona Marzouk.  Townhouse also initiated Egypt's first exhibition dedicated to photography in 2002, calling it PhotoCairo, with the aim of exposing the public to the various forms of self-expression that are evident in the world of photography. This event proved to be quite successful in 2002 so the event was repeated in 2003 and 2004, accompanied by the Open Studio Project.

Recent exhibits that have been on display during February and March 2010 in the Townhouse Gallery include "The Girl Splendid in Walking" by Doa Aly and "Making A Man Out of Him" by a Professor at the American University in Cairo, Huda Lutfi. Both works have proven themselves quite unique to their audiences, each providing a specific experience to the visitors of the Townhouse Gallery.
Regarding Doa Aly's work, the video installation, inspired by Wilhelm Jenson's "Gradiva", includes scenes where the girl was in a room, walking and tracing the sunlight with her feet as it beamed through the window, like she was going after the light. Meanwhile, Lutfi's "Making a Man Out of Him", uses the symbolism of the male anatomy as a means of criticizing society's perspective on masculinity.  This illustrates how the Townhouse Gallery has the ability to display art that may be viewed as controversial.

Overall feedback on the Townhouse Gallery 

Negar Azmy, a Harvard graduate student who worked as a curatorial assistant in the Townhouse Gallery, wrote an article in Nafas Art Magazine. According to this, the Townhouse Gallery, among other private galleries in Egypt, has provided a "home" for the display of visual arts, especially given its recent widespread popularity. However, it is argued by Azmy that "politics remain intimately tied to the arts" and that it is "undeniable" that the state still plays a role in deciding what is displayed in not only the Townhouse, but other independent galleries and museums.  Despite this claim, Azmy also argues that Egyptian artists are indeed flourishing as various galleries in Europe have contacted them in order to display their work.

References

External links 
 Official website
 Facebook group
 Twitter account

Art museums and galleries in Egypt
Art galleries established in 1998
1998 establishments in Egypt
Non-profit organisations based in Egypt
Arab art scene